Pottles Bay (also Pottle Bay) is a natural bay on the coast of Labrador in the province of Newfoundland and Labrador, Canada. It is fed by the Northwest Brook basin and drains into the Labrador Sea.

References

Bays of Newfoundland and Labrador